A Beirute is a Brazilian sandwich influenced by Syrian-Lebanese cuisine made with pita bread, brought to Brazil in the early twentieth century by Levantine immigrants. The Beirute sandwich uses two whole pieces of bread, not inside the pocket of a single piece of bread. The contents of Beirut can vary greatly, the most found ingredients are pita bread, roast beef or sliced silverside, or ham, cheese, lettuce, tomato slices and a fried egg.

The Beirut sandwich developed from the blending of cultural influences in cities like São Paulo. The name Beirute is a reference to the capital of Lebanon, from where many Lebanese Brazilians migrated.

The Beirute has similarities with other sandwiches in Brazil: The combination of ham and cheese exists in the misto-quente toasted sandwich, and ham or roast beef with cheese and tomato exists in the bauru. The combination of lettuce with tomato (and sometimes egg) also exists in some hamburger recipes. 
This type of sandwich is found in various regions and cities of Brazil. Some cafeterias, as well as places that serve hamburgers, serve it with french fries and soda, an influence of American cuisine.

See also

 Bauru
 Kebab
 Sfiha
 List of sandwiches

References

Brazilian cuisine
Culture in São Paulo
Flatbread dishes
Beef sandwiches
Pork sandwiches